Euphoria (Oforia) is an Israeli teen drama television miniseries created and written by Ron Leshem and directed by Dafna Levin, broadcast on Hot 3 from 30 November 2012 to 1 February 2013. The series follows a group of 17-year-olds who spend their time carelessly having sex and taking drugs, with seemingly no parental authority. Adults appear in the series only rarely, and are always filmed at an angle that obscures their faces. Some of the series plot is based on a true story. Skins has been named as an influence on the creators of the series.

In 2019, Euphoria was adapted into an American television series of the same title, which premiered on HBO on 16 June 2019.

Cast and characters 
 Roni Dalumi as Hofit, a teenage drug addict girl and cutter who blames herself for Raanan's death, shares similarities with Rue in the HBO adaptation.
 Kosta Kaplan as Raanan, a 16-year-old murdered the year before the events of the series, based on the 2004 murder of Ra'anan Levy.
 Dekel Adin as Kino, Ra'anan's childhood friend, lives alone while his parents are in Shanghai, has an active imagination and is mostly seen sleeping and in a dream world where he spends his time with Ra'anan in search of "Mirando Al Cielo" in South America.
 Maor Schwitzer as Osher Gimpel, nicknamed "Shamen" (fatty), a self-conscious boy addicted to pornography, experiences impotency as a result. He has sex with the house maid and eventually buys a sex doll.
 Dolev Mesika as Deker Eldar, nicknamed "Tzehubon" (yellow), a shy boy who uses his knowledge of chemistry and online instructional videos to produce and sell hallucinogenic drugs, is in love with Hofit, whom he later rapes when she rejects him. He tries to get into the pilot course in the IDF.
 Roy Nik as Elkana Eldar, Deker's older brother, an IDF defector who spends most of his time having casual sex and giving advice to the others.
 Amit Erez as Noy Cohen, a lonely, obese girl who begins having casual sex with men per Elkana's advice and is subsequently diagnosed as having HIV, shares similarities with Kat in the HBO adaption.
 Avi Mazliah as Uriel, nicknamed "Mastuli" (stoned), an openly gay drifter/couch surfer who has left home and moves from place to place. Per request, he takes Noy's virginity and later stays with Shuki, who tries to perform conversion therapy on him.
 Uriel Geta as Tomer Samigura, nicknamed "Tomeriko", a young drug dealer and Orthodox Jew who later murders Yizhar, Ra'anan's killer, and broadcasts it live on the internet. He shares similarities with Ashtray in the HBO adaptation.
 Tawfeek Barhom as Dudu, a 17-year-old Arab teenager and aspiring veterinarian, lives in Kino's apartment building.
 Ofer Hayoun as Shuki Samiguara, Tomeriko's religious older brother, tries to convert Mastuli.

References

External links
 

2010s teen drama television series
2010s television miniseries
2012 Israeli television series debuts
2013 Israeli television series endings
Euphoria (TV series)
Israeli teen drama television series
Television series about teenagers